Visakhapatnam-I Assembly constituency was a constituency of the Andhra Pradesh Legislative Assembly, India. It is one of 13 constituencies in the Visakhapatnam district until 2009.

Overview
It was a part of the Visakhapatnam Lok Sabha constituency along with another six Vidhan Sabha segments, namely, Srungavarapukota, Uttarapally, Bhogapuram, Visakhapatnam-II (Assembly constituency), Pendurthi, Bheemili

Members of Legislative Assembly

Election results

References

Former assembly constituencies of Andhra Pradesh